Luke O'Reilly (born 21 June 1948 in Liverpool) was a British former alpine skier who competed in the 1968 Winter Olympics.

References

External links
 

1948 births
Living people
Sportspeople from Liverpool
English people of Irish descent
English male alpine skiers
Olympic alpine skiers of Great Britain
Alpine skiers at the 1968 Winter Olympics